In 2017, the Sunwolves participated in the 2017 Super Rugby competition, their second ever appearance in the competition since joining in 2016.

Personnel

Coaches and management

The Sunwolves coaching and management staff for the 2017 Super Rugby season were:

Squad

The following players were named in the Sunwolves squad for the 2017 Super Rugby season:

Log

Matches

Player statistics

The Super Rugby appearance record for players that represented the Sunwolves in 2017 is as follows:

For each match, the player's squad number is shown. Starting players are numbered 1 to 15, while the replacements are numbered 16 to 23. "App" refers to the number of appearances made by the player, "Try" to the number of tries scored by the player, "Kck" to the number of points scored via kicks (conversions, penalties or drop goals) and "Pts" refer to the total number of points scored by the player.

See also

 Sunwolves
 2017 Super Rugby season

References

2017
2017 Super Rugby season by team
2017–18 in Japanese rugby union
2016–17 in Japanese rugby union